Qerimi is an Albanian surname. Notable people with the surname include:

 Luan Qerimi (born 1929), Albanian actor
 Shpat Qerimi (born 1989), Finnish footballer
 Adem Kerimofski (born 1975), Australian musician whose surname origin is Qerimi

Albanian-language surnames